The Gymnastics competitions in the 1973 Summer Universiade were held in Moscow, Soviet Union.

Men's events

Women's events

References
 Universiade gymnastics medalists on HickokSports
 US Gymnastics Federation's Magazine with competition results

1973 in gymnastics
1973 Summer Universiade
Gymnastics at the Summer Universiade
International gymnastics competitions hosted by the Soviet Union